"Stick Together" is a rock song performed by Australian band The Superjesus. The song was released in April 2003 as the lead single from the band's third studio album, Rock Music (2003). The song peaked at number 35 on the Australian ARIA Singles Chart, becoming the band's fourth top 40 single.

In October 2014, The Superjesus went into Music Feeds Studio and performed an acoustic version of "Stick Together".

Track listing
CD Single (2564600072)
 "Stick Together"	
 "Politically Right"	
 "Backburner"
 CD Enhanced with screensavers, wallpaper, photos and exclusive video.

Charts

References

2003 singles
2003 songs
Songs written by Sarah McLeod (musician)
Warner Records singles
The Superjesus songs